Pietro Assalti latinized as Petrus Assaltus (23 June 1680 – 29 April 1728) was an Italian botanist, herbalist, physician, naturalist, professor and writer. 

Assalti was born in Acquaviva Picena. He studied Latin and at the age of fifteen went to Fermo where he acquired a knowledge of Greek, Hebrew, and Arabic. He studied law in Rome and gaining repute as a scholar was chosen by Pope Clement XI and assigned to the Vatican Library. In 1709 he became a professor of botany at the University of Rome, succeeding Giovanni Battista Trionfetti. He became a professor of anatomy in 1719. Assalti compiled, edited, and published the works of Giovanni Maria Lancisi in two volumes in 1718. He annotated Michele Mercati's book on minerals, Metallotheca (1717).

References

External links 
Metallotheca Vaticana Michaelis Mercati (1719)

1680 births
1728 deaths
18th-century Italian physicians